Wiesenbach may refer to several places:

In Austria 
 Wiesenbach (Lower Austria)

In Germany 
 Wiesenbach (Ahlbach), tributary of the Ahlbach (to the Mehrbach) near Orfgen, Altenkirchen (Westerwald), Rhineland-Palatinate
 Wiesenbach (Rhein-Neckar), in Baden-Württemberg
 Wiesenbach, Bavaria, a town in the district of Günzburg in Bavaria